Bank of Africa (BOA Red Sea) is the second largest bank in Djibouti and is part of Mali based Bank of Africa Group. Bank of Africa Group acquired Djibouti based Banque Indosuez Mer Rouge in 2010. BOA Red Sea operates seven branches in Djibouti and a representative office in Addis Ababa.

History
The firm traces its presence in Djibouti to 1908 when Banque de l'Indochine established a branch there, although it had started issuing banknotes for Djibouti in 1907. Banque de l'Indochine had just received the French government concession to create the Franco-Ethiopian Railway between Djibouti and Addis Ababa (Ethiopia).

The bank's name changed as its ownership changed. The Bank of Indochina became in 1974 Bank of Indochina and Suez then Bank Indosuez. The operation in Djibouti became Banque Indosuez Mer Rouge (BIMR).

BIMR had a monopoly on banking services in Djibouti until the arrival of a subsidiary of BNP Paribas in 1954: Bank for Trade and Industry-Red Sea (BCIMR). The two banks' headquarters stood together at Place Lagarde for nearly half a century.

Banque Indosuez Mer Rouge (BIMR) became a wholly owned subsidiary of the French bank Crédit Agricole Indosuez when the Crédit Agricole banking group acquired Banque Indosuez in 1996.

In August 2010 the BOA Group, commenced negotiations to acquire BIMR, negotiations that came to fruition in on 22 December 2010 when the bank became Bank of Africa Red Sea (BOA-Red Sea).

References

External links
Banque Indosuez Mer Rouge @ DjiboutiPhoneBook

Companies based in Djibouti (city)
Banks of Djibouti